The Wylie Baronetcy, of St Petersburg, was a title in the Baronetage of the United Kingdom. It was created on 2 July 1814 for James Wylie, private physician to three successive Tsars of Russia. The title became extinct upon his death in 1854.

Wylie baronet, of St Petersburg (1814)
Sir James Wylie, 1st Baronet (1768–1854)

References

External links
electricscotland.com Sir James Wylie, Baronet

Extinct baronetcies in the Baronetage of the United Kingdom